Nisbet is a surname. Alternate spellings include Nisbett, Nesbit, and Nesbitt. Notable people with the surname include:

 Alexander Nisbet (1657–1725), Scottish heraldist
 Alexander Nisbet (judge) (1777–1857), Judge in the City of Baltimore 
 Andrew Nisbet Jr. (1921–2013), American legislator and military officer
 Andrew Nisbet, founder and chairman of catering supplies retailer Nisbets Plc
 Andy Nisbet, (1953–2019), Scottish mountaineer
 Charles Nisbet (1736–1804), first president of Dickinson College in PA
 Eugenius A. Nisbet (1803–1871), American politician and jurist from the US state of Georgia
 Gavin Nisbet, Scottish footballer (Preston North End FC)
 Harold Nisbet (1873–1937), English amateur tennis player
 Hume Nisbet (1849–1923), Scottish-Australian author and artist
 James Nisbet (disambiguation), several people
 John Nisbet, Lord Dirleton (1609–1687), Scottish judge
 John Nisbet (1627–1685), Scottish covenanter
 Kevin Nisbet, Scottish footballer
 Mary Nisbet (1778–1855), Countess of Elgin
 Murdoch Nisbet (1531–1559), Scottish bible translator
 Robin G. M. Nisbet (1925–2013), classical scholar
 Robert Nisbet (1913–1996), American sociologist
 Scott Nisbet, Scottish footballer (Rangers FC)
 William Nisbet (physician) (1759–1822), Scottish physician

See also
 Nisbett (disambiguation)
 Nesbit (disambiguation)
 Nesbitt (disambiguation)
 Clan Nesbitt